Abdoul Karim Coulibaly (born 23 December 2000) is a Malian college basketball player for the UMass Lowell River Hawks of the America East Conference. He previously played for the Pittsburgh Panthers and the St. Bonaventure Bonnies. Coulibaly is also a member of the Mali national basketball team.

Early life and high school career
Coulibaly grew up in Bamako and played soccer before switching to basketball at age 13, immediately excelling in the new sport. He  moved to the United States at the age of 14 and attended the Scotland Performance Institute in Scotland, Pennsylvania. As a senior, he averaged 15.6 points and 11.4 rebounds per game on a team that finished 36–2. Coulibaly earned 2019 Mid-Atlantic Conference Player of the Year honors. He scored over 1,000 points and led the school all-time in scoring, rebounds, single-game points (42) and single-game rebounds (22).

College career
Coulibaly played sparingly as a freshman and averaged 2.7 points and 1.7 rebounds per game. He increased his scoring to 4.9 points per game over the past eight games. Coulibaly thought that he did not improve much due to a poor work ethic, and struggled with errors in translation as his native language is Bambara. On 23 January 2021, he scored a career-high 15 points in a 76–75 loss to Wake Forest. As a sophomore, Coulibaly averaged 5.2 points and 3.9 rebounds per game. Following the season, he transferred to St. Bonaventure, choosing the Bonnies over Georgetown, Arizona State, Wichita State, Butler, VCU, George Washington, Marshall, and Bradley. He averaged 3.7 points and 1.7 rebounds per game as a junior. Coulibaly transferred to UMass Lowell following the season.

National team career

U19 national team
Coulibaly has represented Mali in several international competitions. He averaged 13 points and 11 rebounds per game to lead Mali to the FIBA U-18 African Championship in 2018. In July 2019, he competed for the Mali team that won a silver medal at the FIBA U19 World Cup. Coulibaly averaged 13.1 points, 6.9 rebounds, 2.4 assists and 2.1 steals per game. In the gold medal game against the United States, he scored 17 points and had three blocks.

Senior national team
Coulibaly was selected for the Mali senior team to play at AfroBasket 2021. In 17 minutes per game, he averaged 5.7 points.

Career statistics

College

|-
| style="text-align:left;"| 2019–20
| style="text-align:left;"| Pittsburgh
| 26 || 0 || 9.9 || .420 || .000 || .480 || 1.7 || .2 || .2 || .2 || 2.7
|-
| style="text-align:left;"| 2020–21
| style="text-align:left;"| Pittsburgh
| 22 || 20 || 22.5 || .511 || .333 || .690 || 3.9 || .9 || .7 || .9 || 5.2
|-
| style="text-align:left;"| 2021–22
| style="text-align:left;"| St. Bonaventure
| 33 || 1 || 9.6 || .500 || .333 || .609 || 1.7 || .2 || .3 || .4 || 3.7
|- class="sortbottom"
| style="text-align:center;" colspan="2"| Career
| 81 || 21 || 13.1 || .483 || .300 || .597 || 2.3 || .4 || .4 || .4 || 3.8

References

External links
St. Bonaventure Bonnies bio
Pittsburgh Panthers bio
UMass Lowell River Hawks bio

2000 births
Living people
Power forwards (basketball)
Pittsburgh Panthers men's basketball players
Malian expatriate basketball people in the United States
Malian men's basketball players
Sportspeople from Bamako
21st-century Malian people
St. Bonaventure Bonnies men's basketball players
UMass Lowell River Hawks men's basketball players